William M. Meredith School is a public K-8 school located in the Queen Village neighborhood of Philadelphia, Pennsylvania. It is a part of the School District of Philadelphia.

Its historic school building was designed by Irwin T. Catharine and built in 1930–1931. It is a 16 bay, yellow, white, and brown brick building on a limestone base in the Art Deco-style. It features pronounced molded brick mullions, two Gothic arched entrances, and brick piers.

History
Kristen M. Graham of the Philadelphia Inquirer wrote that Meredith had been "small and failing". As a way of desegregating the school, the district opened an arts program. It was added to the National Register of Historic Places in 1986. Graham wrote that after the 1970s "Gradually, Meredith turned around." In 2011 Graham wrote that Meredith was "small but high-achieving", and the following year she stated that Meredith was one of "the district's stronger neighborhood schools".

Circa 1993 Stuart Cooperstein became the principal, and he served in the position until 2008. Cooperstein stated in 2008 that the staff and teachers have a high level of devotion to students, and Graham wrote that the parent organization, which had financed the cafeteria's air conditioning system through fundraisers, was devoted. Graham added that the school had retained many of its art-related programs, including drama, music, and visual arts, despite budget cuts.

In 2011 the district announced that it was cutting $30,370 ($ inflation-adjusted) from the school's budget. To prevent the elimination of support staff positions parents held a fundraiser: teachers raised about $5,000 ($ inflation-adjusted) and parents raised over $15,000 ($ inflation-adjusted)  

In 2018, the school was awarded the National Blue Ribbon award..

In 2019 one of the school's teachers, Lea DiRusso was exposed to cancer from Meredith Elementary asbestos. This led a talk with the School District of Philadelphia which then removed asbestos from many school district buildings and schools.

Student body
In 2017 the school had 517 students. Most of them originated from the surrounding area while some commuted from elsewhere. Graham described Meredith's student body as "diverse and stable with high attendance". As of 2018 about 20% of the students are below the poverty line.

Feeder patterns
Neighborhoods assigned to Meredith are also assigned to Furness High School.

References

External links

 Meredith School
 
 William M. Meredith Home & School Association

School buildings on the National Register of Historic Places in Philadelphia
Art Deco architecture in Pennsylvania
School buildings completed in 1931
School District of Philadelphia
South Philadelphia
Public K–8 schools in Philadelphia